Žaga is a dispersed settlement that extends from the valley leading up to the Črnivec Pass up to the Big Pasture Plateau in the Municipality of Kamnik in the Upper Carniola region of Slovenia.

References

External links

Žaga on Geopedia

Populated places in the Municipality of Kamnik